The Archbishop of Melanesia is the spiritual head of the Church of the Province of Melanesia, which is a province of the Anglican Communion in the South Pacific region, covering the nations of Solomon Islands and Vanuatu. From 1861 until the inauguration of Church of the Province of Melanesia in 1975, the Bishop of Melanesia was the head of the Diocese of Melanesia.

Responsibility of the Archbishop
The Church of Melanesia consists of eight dioceses, formed into a single province. The Archbishop of Melanesia is therefore:
Diocesan Bishop of the Diocese of Central Melanesia;
Metropolitan Archbishop of the Province;
Primate of the Melanesian Church, and its representative to the Anglican Primates' meeting.

History of the See
The first Bishop of Melanesia was John Patteson, consecrated in 1861. Three years later his church suffered its first two martyrdoms, and the Bishop was himself martyred in September 1871. He is now remembered in the calendar (list of saints) of many Anglican provinces. In 1922, the synod of the then-missionary diocese was constituted by the New Zealand General Synod (at the Bishop's and people's request). The mission to Melanesia advanced, and the diocese was subdivided and regional diocesan bishops created, until on 26 January 1975. it was officially formed into a new Province of the Anglican church with the Bishop of Melanesia, John Chisholm, becoming the first Bishop of Central Melanesia and Archbishop of Melanesia. With the 1975 foundation of the province, the Diocese of Melanesia was split in four: the Dioceses of Malaita, of Vanuatu and of Ysabel were erected and the remainder became the Central Melanesia diocese.

The primatial archbishop title belongs ex officio to the diocesan bishop of that metropolitan see – as such, the bishop elected as Archbishop leaves his previous see and is translated to Central Melanesia in order to become primate. Chisholm died shortly after appointment and the then dean of St. Barnabas Cathedral, Norman Palmer, was chosen the second archbishop. After Palmer's retirement, the third archbishop was Amos Waiaru, who served until Ellison Pogo replaced him in the office where he served for fourteen years from 1994 to December 2008. He was honored by Elizabeth II, Queen of Solomon Islands – becoming a Knight of the Order of the British Empire – and by Rowan Williams, Archbishop of Canterbury – being awarded the rare medal of the Order of St Augustine.

List of bishops

Archdeaconries
From 1900/3 until 1910, Richard Blundell Comins, in the Solomon Islands, was also called Archdeacon of Northern Melanesia. He was followed by William Uthwatt until 1915.

De Voil was both priest-in-charge of St George's Rabaul and archdeacon until he returned to Great Britain in 1937.

Archdeacons of Southern Melanesia
1894-1902: John Palmer
1902–1913: Thomas Cullwick
December 19331935: Richard Godfrey
13 July 19351939: Alfred Teall

Recent elections
The college of electors, who choose the new primate during a vacancy, last met from 3–5 March 2009, to carry out their electoral duties following Pogo's retirement. They elected David Vunagi, Bishop of Temotu, as the new Archbishop of Melanesia. He was therefore translated to the Diocese of Central Melanesia and became the Archbishop of Melanesia ex officio. He was enthroned on the Feast of Pentecost, 31 May 2009. He left office on 6 September 2015, being replaced as acting Primate by Nathan Tome. On 12 February 2016, George Takeli was elected to become the new Archbishop of Melanesia. He was enthroned on 17 April 2016 at Saint Barnabas' Provincial Cathedral, Honiara.

Notes

References

 
 
1861 establishments in the British Empire
Anglican episcopal offices